Recluse is a small unincorporated community in Campbell County, Wyoming, United States.

A post office has been in operation at Recluse since 1924. The community was so named on account of its isolated location.

Notable people

Sue Wallis - rancher and Republican member of the Wyoming House of Representatives from Campbell County, served from 2007 until her death in January 2014

 Dexter Lumis - WWE Wrestler (Kayfabe)

References 

Unincorporated communities in Wyoming
Unincorporated communities in Campbell County, Wyoming